Mockbul Hossain ( – 24 May 2020) was a Bangladeshi businessman and Bangladesh Awami League politician who served as a Jatiya Sangsad member representing the Dhaka-9 constituency.

Early life and education 
Hossain was born  in Bikrampur. He earned his MA and LLB degrees from the University of Dhaka.

Career 
Hossain was a member of Advisory Council of Bangladesh Awami League. He was elected to parliament from Dhaka-9 as a Bangladesh Awami League candidate in June 1996.

Awards
 Bangladesh Development Sangsad Gold Medal Award

Personal life and death

Hossain died while undergoing treatment for COVID-19 at Combined Military Hospital on 24 May 2020 during the COVID-19 pandemic in Bangladesh.

References 

1950s births
2020 deaths
People from Bikrampur
Bangladeshi businesspeople
Awami League politicians
7th Jatiya Sangsad members
Deaths from the COVID-19 pandemic in Bangladesh